Treaty of Barcelona, a pact of alliance between Holy Roman Emperor Charles V and Pope Clement VII, was signed in Barcelona on June 29, 1529.

Charles V and Pope Clement VII declared their intent to bring peace to Italy and to repel the Turkish advances. In return for Charles V's commitment to restore the Medici in Florence, Pope Clement VII restored Charles V's investiture of Naples, receiving Ravenna, Modena and Rubiera.

References

1529 in Europe
1529 treaties
1529 in the Ottoman Empire
Long Turkish War